Baidyanath Chakrabarty (15 April 2022) was an Indian doctor and reproductive health specialist who was considered a pioneer of reproductive medicine in the country. He was the founder of the Institute of Reproductive Medicine, in Salt Lake, Kolkata, focused on assisted reproductive research. In a career spanning over seven decades, he had performed over 4,000 IVF procedures.

Early life 
Chakrabarty was born in Faridpur in modern-day Bangladesh, in what was then the undivided Bengal. He was the eldest of nine siblings. His father was a signalman with the railways with a transferable job. Chakrabarty stayed back in Chakradharpur, in present-day Jharkhand, when the family traveled along with his father.

He was a topper in his school in his matriculation examinations and received a scholarship from politician Syama Prasad Mukherjee to study at Asutosh College at the University of Calcutta. He studied medicine at the Bengal Medical College, graduating as a topper in gynaecology in 1952. He later traveled to England to complete his post-graduate degree in gynaecology and graduated a Member of Royal College of Obstetricians and Gynaecologists. Having completed his studies in England, he faced financial difficulties in paying for his return trip and ended up taking a hospital job in that country before returning to India.

Career 
Chakrabarty started his career as a member of the faculty at NRS Medical College. During his time here he met and collaborated with Subhash Mukherjee, who delivered Durga, India's first baby by in vitro fertilisation (IVF). Chakrabarty collaborated with Mukherjee on various topics related to fertility medicine. Chakrabarty continued the duo's research after Mukherjee's suicide in 1981.

He collaborated with other doctors including Sudarshan Ghosh Dastidar in setting up of an IVF laboratory. Chakrabarty set up the Institute of Reproductive Medicine in Salt Lake, a satellite city of modern-day Kolkata, in 1986 after retiring as a professor of obstetrics and gynaecology at the NRS Medical College. The institute focused on assisted reproductive technologies and research. He donated the institute to the Indian Council of Medical Research (ICMR) in 2019. As of 2019, the institute treated about 3,000 couples seeking assisted reproductive support annually. Some of his other contributions included advancing embryo transfer technology and development of cost-effective ovulation induction protocols for women after multiple IVF failures. He also studied the genetic linkages to infertility, role of stress in infertility, and endometrial receptivity in endometriosis and recurrent miscarriages. 

Earlier, in 1998, he was the chair of the ICMR committee that was chartered to draft the "national guidelines for accreditation, supervision, and regulation of assisted reproductive technology clinics" in India. In a career spanning seven decades, Chakrabarty performed over 4,000 IVF procedures and was considered a pioneer of IVF and artificial insemination research and treatment in the country. He received a Lifetime Achievement Award in 2019 from the West Bengal government.

Personal life 
Chakrabarty was married to his wife Manjushree, also a doctor, whom he met on his return from England. The couple had two children. He was known to be a fan of Indian cricket, noting in a 2016 interview, "Virat Kohli and Ashwin are such good boys!".

Chakrabarty died on 15 April 2022 in Salt Lake City in Kolkata. He was aged 94. He had earlier been admitted to the Calcutta Heart Clinic after suffering a cerebral stroke and had also undergone an angioplasty.

Select publications

Explanatory notes

References 

1920s births
2022 deaths
Indian gynaecologists
People from Faridpur District
University of Calcutta alumni
Medical doctors from Kolkata